Kyle Cease (born September 19, 1977) is an American actor, comedian, and motivational speaker.

Early life
Cease was born on September 19, 1977 in Bothell, Washington. He began performing comedy at the age of 12. He was a regular in comedy clubs at age 15, and a headliner at the age of 18.

Career
While still residing in his hometown of Bothell, Cease was cast as Bogey Lowenstein in the 1999 movie 10 Things I Hate About You.  Right after the film, he moved to Los Angeles. Two years later he was featured in Not Another Teen Movie, as the slow clapper.  In the same year, he released his first CD, Wait Your Turn.  He has made appearances on The Martin Short Show, One on One, Tuned Up, VH1's Super Secret Movie Rules, and in 2005, the movie The Hand Job. Cease has released a DVD of his nationwide tour called One Dimple. The DVD contains a road documentary, commentary and a performance clip of him on Premium Blend. He was also on Chelsea Lately and other shows that featured his off the cuff style. 

In 2010, Cease released another Comedy Central album, entitled I Highly Recommend This.

He had a Comedy Central Presents special in 2006. He has had hundreds of TV and movie appearances in different commercials, sitcoms and late night shows, etc.

In 2007 Cease had a 1-hour Comedy Central special called Weirder Blacker Dimpler.

He was ranked #1 on Comedy Central's Standup Showdown in 2009.

In 2010, Cease started combining his comedy with public speaking.

Filmography
 10 Things I Hate About You (1999)
 Not Another Teen Movie (2001)

Albums

Works
I Hope I Screw This Up: How Falling In Love with Your Fears Can Change the World (2018) 
The Illusion of Money: Why Chasing Money is Stopping You from Receiving It (2019)

References

External links

Official website

Kyle's Myspace

1977 births
Living people
20th-century American comedians
21st-century American comedians
American male film actors
American motivational speakers
American stand-up comedians
Male actors from Washington (state)
People from Bothell, Washington